The Future Sugar is the second full-length album by Mexican rock band Rey Pila, released on July 17, 2015 via Cult Records.

Track listing

Credits
 Chris Coady – producer
 Julian Casablancas – producer
 Diego Solórzano – producer
 Shawn Everett – mixer
 Joe LaPorta – mastering
 Liz Hirsch – artwork

References

2015 albums
Cult Records albums
Rey Pila albums